Kiria Tikanah Abdul Rahman (born 25 June 2000) is a Singaporean épée fencer. She competed in the 2020 Summer Olympics.

References

External links
 

2000 births
Living people
Singaporean female épée fencers
Olympic fencers of Singapore
Fencers at the 2020 Summer Olympics
Fencers at the 2018 Asian Games
Competitors at the 2019 Southeast Asian Games
Competitors at the 2021 Southeast Asian Games
Southeast Asian Games medalists in fencing
Southeast Asian Games gold medalists for Singapore
Southeast Asian Games silver medalists for Singapore
21st-century Singaporean women